Francesca Gino is an Italian-American behavioral scientist and the Tandon Family Professor of Business Administration and unit head of the Negotiation, Organizations and Markets (NOM) unit at the Harvard Business School. She is also affiliated with Harvard Law School's Program on Negotiation, and with Harvard University's Mind, Brain, Behavior Initiative. Since December 2016, she has served as  editor-in-chief of Organizational Behavior and Human Decision Processes. Before joining Harvard in 2010, she taught at the University of North Carolina at Chapel Hill.

Gino is known for her research on rule-breaking, which she discusses in her new book, Rebel Talent.

Books

References

External links

Faculty page

Living people
Harvard Business School faculty
Harvard University alumni
University of Trento alumni
Italian emigrants to the United States
Academic journal editors
University of North Carolina at Chapel Hill faculty
1978 births